A ménage à trois is a domestic arrangement in which three people having sexual relations occupy the same household. 

Ménage à Trois may also refer to:

Music
Menage a Trois (album), an album by Baby Bash
"Ménage à Trois" (song), a song by Alcazar
"Menage à Trois", a song by trio K-Ram, which featured member Amanda Redington
"Menage a Trois", a song by Dolour from Suburbiac

Other uses
Ménage à 3 (webcomic), a Keenspot webcomic began May 2008
Ménage à Trois, a brand of wine produced by Folie à Deux

See also
"Ménage à Troi", an episode of Star Trek: The Next Generation
 Ménage (disambiguation)